HMS Bergamot was a  that served in the Royal Navy.

Construction
She was laid down at Harland and Wolff in Belfast on 15 October 1940 and launched on 15 February 1941. Her commissioning followed on 12 May of the same year. Her pennant number was K189.

Royal Navy wartime service
Her main duty was as a convoy escort and in this capacity she crossed the Atlantic - North and South -  several times, escorting convoys to and from the United Kingdom.

On two occasions Bergamot was involved in Arctic convoys to the Soviet Union, once to Murmansk and once to Archangel. Most notably she took part in convoy PQ 18, sailing all the way from Loch Ewe in Scotland to Russia, subjected for days on end to attacks by German aircraft.

She sailed from Liverpool with the convoy which initiated the Allied invasion of Sicily in 1943 (Operation Husky). From then on the Mediterranean was her home: escorting supplies to Tobruk; being involved in the invasions at Salerno in September 1943 and Anzio in January 1944; she was also present when the Italian fleet surrendered to the Allies.

Post-war mercantile service
After the war she was sold in May 1946 to a Greek company and became a ferry, carrying passengers between the various Greek islands. She belonged to different companies and had different names – Syros, Delphini and Ekaterina. She was broken up in 1974.

References

External links
HMS Bergamot on the Arnold Hague database at convoyweb.org.uk.

 

Flower-class corvettes of the Royal Navy
Ships built in Belfast
1941 ships
Ships built by Harland and Wolff